Air Commodore Gordon Henry Steege, DSO, DFC (31 October 1917 – 1 September 2013) was a senior officer in the Royal Australian Air Force (RAAF). He became a fighter ace in World War II, credited with eight aerial victories. Joining the RAAF in July 1937, Steege first saw action with No. 3 Squadron in the Middle East, where he was awarded the Distinguished Flying Cross after shooting down three German aircraft in a single sortie. He rose to command No. 450 Squadron in the Desert Air Force, before being posted to the South West Pacific, where he led Nos. 73 and 81 Wings. He earned the Distinguished Service Order for his "outstanding leadership", and finished the war a temporary group captain.

Resigning his commission following the end of World War II, Steege rejoined the RAAF during the Korean War, and briefly took command of No. 77 Squadron late in 1951. Returning to Australia, he held senior administrative and training posts before taking charge of RAAF Base Canberra in 1957. In the 1960s he was appointed to various planning positions, followed by command of RAAF Base Amberley, Queensland, and later RAAF Base Butterworth, Malaysia. Having been raised to air commodore, his final appointment before retiring in 1972 was on the staff of Headquarters Operational Command (now Air Command) at RAAF Base Glenbrook, New South Wales. He subsequently became an aeronautical consultant, and died in Sydney in 2013, aged 95.

Early career
The son of William and Ida Steege, Gordon Henry Steege was born in the Sydney suburb of Chatswood on 31 October 1917, and educated at North Sydney Boys High School. He recalled having always been interested in a military career, applying unsuccessfully to enter the Royal Australian Navy when he was twelve, and the Royal Military College, Duntroon, after he left school and started working with the Perpetual Trustee Company. On 21 July 1937, he joined the Royal Australian Air Force (RAAF), undergoing flight instruction at No. 1 Flying Training School in Point Cook, Victoria. He graduated with a distinguished pass on 23 June 1938, and was commissioned a pilot officer. His first posting was to No. 3 (Army Cooperation) Squadron at RAAF Station Richmond, New South Wales, flying Hawker Demon biplane fighters. Steege and the squadron participated in several exercises with the Australian Army, undertaking reconnaissance, spotting for artillery, and practising ground-attack missions. He was promoted to flying officer in December 1938.

World War II
Following the outbreak of World War II in September 1939, Steege was appointed adjutant of the newly formed No. 11 Squadron, which initially operated two Short Type C flying boats requisitioned from Qantas Empire Airways. Half of the squadron's personnel were Qantas employees. On 25 September, No. 11 Squadron became the RAAF's first unit to be based in Papua New Guinea, when the flying boats, accompanied by Steege in a De Havilland Dragon Rapide, flew to Port Moresby to undertake maritime reconnaissance in the region.

Middle East

Steege returned to No. 3 Squadron in May 1940, was promoted to flight lieutenant the following month, and shipped out to the Middle East with his unit on 15 July. Piloting a Gloster Gladiator biplane, he achieved his first aerial victory in the North African campaign when he shot down an Italian Fiat CR.42 on 10 December 1940; he also claimed a "probable" in the same action. Three days later he shared in three more "kills": two CR.42s and a Savoia-Marchetti SM.79. After No. 3 Squadron converted to Hawker Hurricanes, Steege shot down three Junkers Ju 87s in a single sortie near Mersa Matruh on 18 February 1941, to become his unit's second ace. Following this exploit, and the destruction of a Messerschmitt Bf 110 on 3 April, he was awarded the Distinguished Flying Cross. The recommendation noted his "unfailing courage", and the award was promulgated in the London Gazette on 11 April.

Raised to acting squadron leader, Steege was given command of the newly arrived No. 450 Squadron at Rayak, Lebanon, on 31 May 1941. The assignment was a challenging one, as the operational requirements of existing forces, and the RAAF Air Board's insistence on staffing Article XV squadrons such as No. 450 with Australian Empire Air Training Scheme aircrew rather than Permanent Air Force members, meant that the unit was short of experienced pilots. Steege was mentioned in despatches on 24 September 1941 for his leadership of the squadron. By December, it was at nominal strength and equipped with P-40 Kittyhawks; it commenced combat operations out of Gambut and El Adem, Libya, and began registering victories in February 1942. Steege himself scored a confirmed victory over a Messerschmitt Bf 109 on 28 March. His final tally in the Middle Eastern theatre was eight enemy aircraft destroyed, two probables and five damaged. He returned to Australia a temporary wing commander in December 1942.

South West Pacific

Steege undertook a fighter sector course in January 1943, and was given command of No. 8 Fighter Sector Headquarters in Brisbane. As a result, he later contended, of his petitioning Eastern Area Command for reassignment to combat duties and complaining to Group Officer Clare Stevenson that there were too many WAAAFs in the sector for an unmarried man to supervise, he was posted to command No. 14 Mobile Fighter Sector Headquarters at Camden, New South Wales, on 23 May. The following month, the unit deployed to Goodenough Island in New Guinea as part of No. 71 (Fighter) Wing, becoming operational on 27 June. In August it moved to Kiriwina, under the aegis of No. 73 (Fighter) Wing. Steege relinquished command on 1 October to take charge of No. 73 Wing. The wing's combat units consisted of two P-40 Kittyhawk squadrons and a Supermarine Spitfire squadron. As part of the build-up to the Battle of Arawe in December, the Kittyhawks launched a series of assaults on Gasmata; three days before the Allied landings, Steege personally led a force of thirty-four aircraft in a bombing and strafing attack on the town's landing strip. In January 1944, the wing took part in the two largest raids mounted by the RAAF to that time, each involving over seventy aircraft attacking enemy camps and depots at Lindenhafen, New Britain. Steege was promoted acting group captain the following month; the rank was made temporary in July.

As part of the RAAF's contribution to the Admiralty Islands campaign, Steege led No. 73 Wing on garrison duty at Los Negros, commencing in March 1944. The wing's combat squadrons—Nos. 76, 77 and 79—were supported by No. 49 Operational Base Unit, No. 114 Mobile Fighter Sector (formerly No. 14 Mobile Fighter Sector), No. 27 Air Stores Park and No. 26 Medical Clearing Station, among other ancillaries. The fighters' main duty was providing cover for Allied shipping; they also carried out bomber escort, ground attack and anti-shipping missions. In mid-April, the wing escorted the largest Allied convoy in the South West Pacific to that date, 80 ships carrying 30,000 personnel, from Finschhafen to Aitape. On 11 April, Steege was awarded the Distinguished Service Order for his "outstanding leadership in aerial combat in New Guinea". Completing their garrison work in the Admiralties that June, No. 73 Wing's Kittyhawk units were transferred to No. 81 (Fighter) Wing on Noemfoor under Steege's command. In September 1944, No. 81 Wing became part of No. 10 Operational Group, which was renamed the Australian First Tactical Air Force the following month. During October and November, No. 81 Wing undertook offensive sweeps and ground attacks against targets in West Papua, and dive bombed Japanese airfields on Halmahera. Steege handed over command of the wing to Group Captain Wilf Arthur in December 1944. In January 1945, Steege became senior air staff officer (SASO) at Eastern Area Command in Sydney. He was posted to RAAF Headquarters, Melbourne, in May. From June to December, he attended the Army and Navy Staff College in Washington, D.C.

Korean War and after

Steege married Joan Iris Masters, eldest daughter of Frank S. Tait, on 5 January 1946; they had a son and a daughter. He was appointed RAAF Director of Operations in February.  In December 1946, he resigned from the RAAF, joining the New Guinea Administration as a patrol officer the next month. He rejoined the Air Force as a wing commander on the outbreak of the Korean War in June 1950. The following month, he accompanied Major General William Bridgeford's mission to Malaya. Steege assumed command of RAAF Station Schofields, New South Wales, in September 1950, and commenced a jet training course at RAAF Station Williamtown early the next year. On 16 August 1951, he was posted to Kimpo, South Korea, as commander of No. 77 Squadron, shortly after its conversion from P-51 Mustang piston-engined fighters to Gloster Meteor jets. One of his first actions, following discussions with the US Fifth Air Force, was to take the Australian unit out of its then-current air-to-air combat role, and curtail its operations in "MiG Alley". Two encounters between No. 77 Squadron and Chinese MiG-15s had convinced Steege that the straight-winged Meteors were outclassed as fighters by the swept-wing MiGs. His decision caused controversy as some UN commanders believed that proper training and tactics would have allowed the Meteor to remain competitive as a fighter, while for the Australian pilots the change of role amounted to a loss of prestige. However, Steege was backed up by the Chief of the Air Staff, Air Marshal George Jones, and the squadron was relegated mainly to escort duty and local air defence. Morale suffered and it was not until after Steege's departure on 26 December that a suitable offensive role was again found for the Meteors, namely ground attack.

After returning to Australia, Steege was appointed chief instructor at the School of Land/Air Warfare, Williamtown, in February 1952. He was attached to the Department of Air in Canberra for two years beginning in August 1953, holding secretarial posts on the Chiefs of Staff Committee, Joint Planning Committee, and Defence Committee. After serving on the staff of Headquarters Training Command from August 1955 to May 1957, he took command of RAAF Base Canberra, Australian Capital Territory. At this time No. 86 Wing, operating Douglas Dakotas and Convair 440 Metropolitains, was located at Canberra, in part to satisfy the Federal government's VIP transport needs. Steege was promoted to acting group captain in May 1958 (substantive two months later), before becoming a senior planner at the SEATO Military Planning Office, Bangkok, in December 1958. He returned to the Department of Air in December 1961, where he rose to Director of Plans. Promoted to air commodore, he was appointed Officer Commanding (OC) RAAF Base Amberley, Queensland, in November 1964. Amberley was home to the RAAF's bomber headquarters, No. 82 Wing, which operated English Electric Canberra jets. In May 1967, Steege became OC RAAF Base Butterworth, Malaysia.  The RAAF maintained two squadrons of fighters at Butterworth: No. 75 Squadron flying Dassault Mirages, and also No. 77 Squadron flying CAC Sabres until 1969, and the Mirage-equipped No. 3 Squadron after that. Returning to Australia, Steege served as SASO with Headquarters Operational Command (now Air Command) at RAAF Base Glenbrook, New South Wales, from May 1970 until retiring from the Air Force on 31 October 1972.

Later life
After leaving the RAAF, Steege served as a consultant to several aerospace defence firms. In 2004, he married Jennifer Fisher, his partner since 1987. He maintained his connection with No. 450 Squadron in his later years. As a guest at the 1994 RAAF History Conference in Canberra he spoke at length on the difficulties of establishing the unit in the Middle East in 1941. He became patron of the squadron association in April 2008. In 2010, he joined three fellow members of No. 3 Squadron who had shipped out to the Middle East on 15 July 1940 for the 70th anniversary commemoration of the event at RAAF Base Richmond. Steege made his home in Palm Beach, New South Wales, and died on 1 September 2013, aged 95. He was survived by his second wife, son Peter and stepdaughter Diana.

Notes

References

1917 births
2013 deaths
Australian aviators
Australian Companions of the Distinguished Service Order
Australian military personnel of the Korean War
Australian recipients of the Distinguished Flying Cross (United Kingdom)
Australian World War II flying aces
People from Sydney
Royal Australian Air Force officers
People educated at North Sydney Boys High School